Vito Falconieri (born 18 June 1986) is an Italian footballer who plays for Martina in Eccellenza.

Club career

Early career

Born in Brindisi, Apulia, Falconieri was a player of Torino Calcio's reserve team in 2004–05 season. He also wore no. 32 shirt with the first team.

Catania
In 2007 Falconieri joined Calcio Catania, however he was farmed to Gela along with Iannelli (loan), Bucolo (loan), Monastra (co-ownership) and Tedesco (co-ownership).

Falconieri made his Serie A debut on 26 April 2009 against U.S. Lecce.

Ascoli
In June 2009, Catania confirmed the purchase of Italian U-21 international Giuseppe Bellusci from Ascoli Calcio while Falconieri and teammate Marcello Gazzola were sold to Ascoli Calcio in joint-ownership deals. On 31 August 2009, it was confirmed that Ascoli and Catania agreed to loan the player to third division club Taranto Sport.

In 2010, Falconieri was loaned out to L'Aquila.

On 31 August 2012 Falconieri was signed by F.C. Crotone in a temporary deal, with Massimo Loviso moved to opposite direction. He wore no.8 shirt.

Later career
In July 2013 he was sold outright to Parma, who in turn sent him on loan to Gubbio. In September 2015, after being released following the bankruptcy of Parma, he signed with Altovicentino, a Serie D team.

On 23 July 2016 he signed for Grosseto, again in Serie D.

On December of the same year, Falconieri moved definitively to San Severo, another team of Serie D.

References

External links
 
 

Living people
Italian footballers
1986 births
Serie A players
Serie B players
Serie C players
Serie D players
Casale F.B.C. players
U.S. Catanzaro 1929 players
A.C. Reggiana 1919 players
Catania S.S.D. players
Taranto F.C. 1927 players
Ascoli Calcio 1898 F.C. players
A.C. Montichiari players
L'Aquila Calcio 1927 players
F.C. Crotone players
Parma Calcio 1913 players
A.S. Gubbio 1910 players
F.C. Pavia players
Santarcangelo Calcio players
F.C. Grosseto S.S.D. players
Association football forwards